Amblyseius eharai is a species of mite in the family Phytoseiidae.

References

eharai
Articles created by Qbugbot
Animals described in 1981